Saint-Cernin (Languedocien: Sent Sarnin) is a former commune in the Lot department in south-western France. On 1 January 2016, it was merged into the new commune of Les Pechs-du-Vers.

See also
Communes of the Lot department

References

Saintcernin